Tazakend or T’azak’end may refer to:

Armenia
Ashotavan, Armenia
Tasik, Armenia
Tavshut, Armenia
Tazagyugh, Gegharkunik, Armenia

Azerbaijan
Babek (city), Azerbaijan
Şahsevən Təzəkənd, Azerbaijan 
Təzəkənd, Nakhchivan (disambiguation)
Təzəkənd, Kangarli, Azerbaijan 
Təzəkənd, Sharur, Azerbaijan
Təzəkənd, Maxta, Azerbaijan 
Təzəkənd, Agdam, Azerbaijan
Təzəkənd, Aghjabadi, Azerbaijan
Təzəkənd, Beylagan, Azerbaijan
Təzəkənd, Bilasuvar (disambiguation)
 Təzəkənd (39° 21' N 48° 35' E), Bilasuvar, Azerbaijan
 Təzəkənd (39° 32' N 48° 24' E), Bilasuvar, Azerbaijan
Təzəkənd, Dashkasan, Azerbaijan
Təzəkənd, Davachi, Azerbaijan
Təzəkənd, Ismailli, Azerbaijan
Təzəkənd, Jalilabad
 Təzəkənd (39° 13' N 48° 18' E), Jalilabad, Azerbaijan
 Təzəkənd (39° 20' N 48° 28' E), Jalilabad, Azerbaijan
Təzəkənd, Lachin, Azerbaijan
Təzəkənd, Lankaran, Azerbaijan
Təzəkənd, Masally, Azerbaijan
Təzəkənd, Nakhchivan (disambiguation)
Təzəkənd, Kangarli, Azerbaijan
Təzəkənd, Maxta, Azerbaijan
Təzəkənd, Sharur, Azerbaijan
Təzəkənd, Salyan, Azerbaijan
Təzəkənd, Shamkir, Azerbaijan
Təzəkənd, Tartar
Təzəkənd (40° 18' N 47° 07' E), Tartar, Azerbaijan
Təzəkənd (40° 23' N 46° 54' E), Tartar, Azerbaijan
Təzəkənd, Zardab, Azerbaijan

Iran
Tazeh Kand (disambiguation)

See also
Təzəkənd (disambiguation)